The 22959/22960 Surat - Jamnagar Intercity Express is a Superfast train belonging to Indian Railways - Western Railway zone that runs between  and  in India.

Coaches

22959/60 Surat - Jamnagar Intercity Express presently has 3 AC Chair Car(CC), 1 First Class(FC), 6 2nd Class Seating(2S), 9 General Unreserved(GEN) & 2 SLR (Seating Luggage Rake) coaches. It does not have a Pantry car coach.

As is customary with most train services in India, Coach Composition may be amended at the discretion of Indian Railways depending on demand.

Service

22959 Surat - Jamnagar Intercity Express covers the distance of 561 km in 10 hours 10 mins (55 km/hr) & in 10 hours 05 mins as 22960 Jamnagar - Surat Intercity Express (56 km/hr).

As the average speed of the train is above 55 km/hr, as per Indian Railways rules, its fare includes a Superfast Express surcharge.

Route and Halts

The important halts of the train are:

Traction

Timings

22959 Surat - Jamnagar Intercity Express leaves  every day except Monday at 13:30 PM IST and reaches  at 23:40 PM IST the same day.

22960 Jamnagar - Surat Intercity Express leaves  every day except Tuesday at 04:45 AM IST and reaches  at 14:50 PM IST the same day.

Rake Sharing

The train shares its rake with 12935/12936 Bandra Terminus - Surat Intercity Express and 22961/22962 Surat - Hapa Intercity Weekly Express.

References

External links

Rail transport in Gujarat
Intercity Express (Indian Railways) trains
Transport in Surat
Transport in Jamnagar